Louis Marcoussis, formerly Ludwik Kazimierz Wladyslaw Markus or Ludwig Casimir Ladislas Markus, (1878 or 1883, Łódź – October 22, 1941, Cusset) was a painter and engraver of Polish origin who lived in Paris for much of his life and became a French citizen.

Early life 
After studying law briefly in Warsaw he went to the Kraków Academy of Fine Arts, where his teachers included Jan Stanislawski and Jozev Mehoffer. Moving to Paris in 1903, he spent a short time at the Académie Julian under Jules Lefebvre. The first time a painting of his was shown in a major exhibition was at the Salon d'Automne in 1905, and over the next quarter-century his work was shown in many other important exhibitions, in particular at the Salon des Indépendants and the Salon des Tuileries.

He drew cartoons for satirical journals, as he had earlier in Poland. In Paris he needed to earn his own living, and also took on other drawing and illustration work. In the cafés of Montmartre and Montparnasse he got to know Apollinaire, Braque, Degas, Picasso and many more artists and writers. It was Apollinaire who suggested Markus' French name, Marcoussis, after a village not far from Paris.

Cubist epoch 
Impressionism influenced his early paintings, but from about 1911 he was part of the Cubist movement alongside other avant-garde painters like Picasso, Braque, Juan Gris and those of the Section d'Or. His work was shown in exhibitions in many European cities and in the US. In 1925 he had his first solo exhibition in Paris. As well as painting still lifes and musical instruments in the Cubist manner, he also produced portraits, views of Paris, and images from the Breton seaside.

In 1913 he had married Alice Halicka, a painter who came from Kraków. Their daughter Malène was born in 1922. Marcoussis served in a Polish company of the French Foreign Legion from 1914 to 1919. He became a French citizen, while also staying in touch with Poland, both personally and professionally. He did not generally talk about his Jewish ancestry, and his family had converted to Catholicism, but today Marcoussis is often described as a Jewish artist.

Later life 
From 1930 onwards, much as his friend Clément Serveau, he concentrated on printmaking and illustration, including work inspired by Apollinaire's Alcool, Tzara's Indicateur des chemins de cœur, and Éluard's Lingères légères and Aurélia. In the late 1930s Marcoussis collaborated with Spanish surrealist Joan Miró and taught him etching techniques, culminating in Miró's Black and Red Series, now in the collection of the Museum of Modern Art. He also taught at the Académie Schlaefer.

After Nazi troops arrived in Paris in 1940, Marcoussis and Alice moved to Cusset near Vichy. He died there on 22 October 1941.

Selected exhibitions
 1905 Salon d'Automne, Paris
 1906 Salon des Indépendants, Paris
 1912 Salon de la Section d'Or, Paris
 1920 Exposition de la Section d'Or, Paris
 1925 Galerie Le Pierre, Paris
 1928 Galerie Le Centaure, Brussels
 1929 Galerie Georges Bernheim, Paris
 1929 Galerie Jeanne Bucher, Paris
 1933 Galerie Knoedler, New York City
 1934 Arts Club, Chicago
 1936 Palais des Beaux-Arts, Brussels
 1937 Palais des Beaux-Arts, Brussels
 1939 London Gallery, London
 1949 Retrospective in Paris
 1950 Retrospective in Basel
 1951 Retrospective in Brussels
(List from German Wikipedia)

References

Irena Kossowska, Louis Marcoussis (Ludwik Kazimierz Markus), Instytut Sztuki Polskiej Akademii Nauk July 2004 (pl)

External links 
Grove Dictionary of Art
Artcyclopedia
French National Library

Year of birth uncertain
1941 deaths
19th-century Polish Jews
Polish emigrants to France
19th-century French painters
French male painters
20th-century French painters
19th-century Polish painters
20th-century French male artists
Jan Matejko Academy of Fine Arts alumni
Académie Julian alumni
Soldiers of the French Foreign Legion
19th-century French male artists